Americium(II) iodide is the inorganic compound with the formula AmI2. It is a black solid which crystallizes in the same motif as strontium bromide.

References

Americium compounds
Iodides
Actinide halides